Journal of Daylighting is a biannual, online peer-reviewed scientific journal devoted to investigations of daylighting in buildings. It is published by SolarLits, and the current editor-in-chief is Dr Irfan Ullah.

Abstracting and indexing
The journal is abstracted and indexed in:
 Scopus
 Directory of Open Access Journals
 Avery Index to Architectural Periodicals

References

External links
 

Engineering journals
English-language journals
Publications established in 2014